

The Silver Arrow Sniper is a reconnaissance UAV developed in Israel in the 1990s.

The Sniper's configuration resembles that of a conventional private aircraft with fixed tricycle landing gear, driven by a nose-mounted propeller and a 28.5 kW (38 horsepower) piston engine. Its only unusual feature is an upright vee tail.

Specifications

References
 Jane's Unmanned Aerial Vehicles and Targets

This article contains material that originally came from the web article Unmanned Aerial Vehicles by Greg Goebel, which exists in the Public Domain.

1990s Israeli military reconnaissance aircraft
Elbit unmanned aerial vehicles
V-tail aircraft